The  is a subway line which forms part of the Nagoya Municipal Subway system in Nagoya, Japan. It runs from Kami Otai in Nishi-ku, Nagoya to Akaike in Nisshin. The Tsurumai Line's color on maps is light blue. Its stations carry the letter T followed by a number. Officially, the line is called . All the stations accept manaca, a rechargeable contactless smart card.

The line opened its first section in 1977. The line has through services with three Meitetsu lines, namely Inuyama Line, Toyota Line and Mikawa Line.

Stations

Rolling stock
 3000 series
 3050 series (since 1993)
 N3000 series (since 16 March 2012)
 Meitetsu 100 series (on through-running services))

See also
 List of railway lines in Japan

References

External links 
  

Nagoya Municipal Subway
Railway lines opened in 1977
1067 mm gauge railways in Japan